Ivan-Arakhley Lake System is a group of fresh water bodies in the Chita District, Zabaykalsky Krai, Russia. The villages of Arakhley, Tasei and Preobrazhenka are located near the lakes. 

The lakes are a tourist attraction and there are holiday cottages and resorts near them.

Geography
The lakes lie at the southeastern end of the Vitim Plateau. As a group, they are also known as "Beklemishev Lakes" since they stretch roughly from SW to NE for about  along the Beklemishev Depression.

The lake system includes 6 large lakes with a water surface of more than : Arakhley, Shaksha, Irgen, Ivan, Tasei and Bolshoy Undugun. Arakhley is the largest of the group and is also the one having the greatest depth.

Hydrography
Lakes Ivan and Tasei belong to the Lena basin. Arakhley, Shaksha, Bolshoy Undugun and Irgen are separated from them by a slight elevation and belong to the Baikal basin through the Khilok river, a tributary of the Selenga.

See also
List of lakes of Russia
Lake Kenon

References

External links

Беклемишевские озера в Забайкальском крае - рай для рыбаков!
«Уху евшие»: На Арахлее стал ловиться крупный чебак 
Lakes of Zabaykalsky Krai
Lake groups of Russia